Rachel Harris (born 1979) is an Australian freestyle and medley swimmer.

Rachel Harris may also refer to:

Rachael Harris (born 1968), American actress and comedian
Rachel Harris (artist) (born 1991), American artist and model
Rachel Davis Harris (1869–1969), American librarian and activist
Rachel Oakes Preston (1809–1868), Harris, American Seventh Day Baptist

See also
Rachel Harrison (born 1966), American visual artist